Milad Zakipour (born November 23, 1995) is an Iranian football defender, who currently plays for Sepahan in the Persian Gulf Pro League.

Club career

Naft Tehran
He promoted to first team in December 2015. He made his debut for Naft Tehran on 28 December 2015 against Tractor Sazi as a substitute for Vahid Hamdinejad.

Esteghlal
He joins Esteghlal in June 2016 for a three-year contract.

Gol Gohar Sirjan
He joins Gol Gohar Sirjan on 3 November 2020 for one-year contract.

Club career statistics

Honours
Esteghlal
Hazfi Cup: 2017–18

References

External links
 Milad Zakipour at IranLeague.ir

Sportspeople from Mazandaran province
Iranian footballers
Association football defenders
Association football wingers
Naft Tehran F.C. players
Esteghlal F.C. players
1995 births
Living people
People from Nowshahr